A revamped version of the first album with vocals by N'Dea Davenport was then released, and the singles "Never Stop" was released including "Dream Come True" & "Stay This Way", all with Davenport on lead vocals, became hits on both sides of the Atlantic, with the latter becoming a music video directed by Douglas Gayeton that saw heavy rotation on MTV.

Track listing
CD Single
"Never Stop" (Single Radio Edit) - (3:39)
"Never Stop" (Morales Extended Mix) - (6:49)
Remixed by David Morales
"Never Stop" (Heavies Extended Mix) - (5:39)
"Never Stop" (Kincaid Mix) - (3:51)
Remixed by Jan Kincaid

1991 singles
1991 songs
FFRR Records singles